The AEG N.I was a German biplane night-bomber which saw limited action during World War I. A total of 37 were built. Several were used postwar as airliners.

Specifications

References

Bibliography

N.I
1910s German bomber aircraft
Single-engined tractor aircraft
Biplanes
Aircraft first flown in 1917